Bavykina is a rural locality (a village) in Karachevsky District, Bryansk Oblast, Russia. The population was 2 as of 2010. There is 1 street.

Geography 
Bavykina is located 25 km southeast of Karachev (the district's administrative centre) by road. Moiseyeva Gora is the nearest rural locality.

References 

Rural localities in Karachevsky District